The 645th Radar Squadron is an inactive United States Air Force unit. It was last assigned to the 20th Air Division, Aerospace Defense Command, stationed at Patrick Air Force Base, Florida. It was inactivated on 1 April 1976.

The unit was a General Surveillance Radar squadron providing for the air defense of the United States.

Lineage
 Activated 30 April 1948 as the 645th Aircraft Control Squadron
 Redesignated 6 December 1949 as the 645th Aircraft Control and Warning Squadron
 Inactivated on 6 February 1952
 Redesignated 645th Radar Squadron (SAGE)and activated on 28 June 1963
 Organized on 1 November 1962
 Redesignated 645th Radar Squadron on 1 February 1974
 Inactivated on 1 April 1976

Assignments
 503d Aircraft Control and Warning Group, 30 April 1949 – 6 February 1952
 Air Defense Command, 28 June 1962
 Montgomery Air Defense Sector, 1 November 1962
 32d Air Division, 1 April 1966
 33d Air Division, 14 November 1969
 20th Air Division, 19 November 1969 – 1 April 1976

Stations
 Roslyn AFS, New York, 1 April 1948
 Selfridge AFB, Michigan, March 1949
 Roslyn AFS, New York, 8 December 1949 - 6 February 1952
 Patrick AFB, Florida, 28 June 1962 – 1 April 1976

Notes
 The squadron was programmed for activation in the 1950s at Marathon AS, Ontario, but this action was cancelled.  During the 1960s Air Force units that were activated were paper units until they were organized.

References

  Cornett, Lloyd H. and Johnson, Mildred W., A Handbook of Aerospace Defense Organization  1946 - 1980, Office of History, Aerospace Defense Center, Peterson AFB, CO (1980)
 Winkler, David F. & Webster, Julie L., Searching the Skies, The Legacy of the United States Cold War Defense Radar Program,  US Army Construction Engineering Research Laboratories, Champaign, IL (1997)

External links

Radar squadrons of the United States Air Force
Aerospace Defense Command units